Steven Ward (born 30 October 1958) is a former English cricketer.  Ward was a left-handed batsman who bowled right-arm medium-fast.  He was born in Horden, County Durham.

Ward made his debut for Durham against Hertfordshire in 1987 Minor Counties Championship.  He played Minor counties cricket for Durham only in the 1987 season, making 3 further Minor Counties Championship appearances.  He made his only List A appearance against Middlesex in the 1987 NatWest Trophy.  He didn't bat in the match, while with the ball he bowled 6 wicket-less overs.

References

External links
Steven Ward at ESPNcricinfo
Steven Ward at CricketArchive

1958 births
Living people
People from Horden
Cricketers from County Durham
English cricketers
Durham cricketers